Kuunkuiskaajat (/kuːn.kuˈi skaːjat/; "Moonwhisperers") is a Finnish female folk duo made up of Värttinä members Susan Aho and Johanna Virtanen, that represented Finland in the Eurovision Song Contest 2010 with the song "Työlki ellää". The duo won the Finnish national final, Euroviisut 2010, with 42% of the "super final" vote.

"Työlki ellää" did not qualify for the final, placing 11th in the first Semi-Final on 25 May 2010, missing the cut by only three points.

Discography 
 Kuunkuiskaajat (2009)
 Revitty rakkaus (2016)

External links

 Official Website
 MySpace Website
 

Finnish folk musical groups
Eurovision Song Contest entrants of 2010
Eurovision Song Contest entrants for Finland
Finnish musical duos
Folk music duos
Female musical duos